Basit Ahmed Siddiqui is a Pakistani politician who has been a member of the Provincial Assembly of Sindh since August 2018.

Political career

He was elected to the Provincial Assembly of Sindh as a candidate of Muttahida Qaumi Movement from Constituency PS-121 (Karachi West-X) in 2018 Pakistani general election.

References

Living people
Muttahida Qaumi Movement MPAs (Sindh)
Year of birth missing (living people)